Earth Shaker is a cult title for Poseidon, an ancient Greek god.

Earth Shaker, Earth-Shaker or Earthshaker may refer also to:

 Pachacuti, a ruler of the Inca Empire who took the title "Pachacuti", meaning Earth Shaker
 Kengue, an important figure in Kongolese mythology known sometimes as the Earth Shaker
 Seismosaurus, an antiquated name for a species of sauropod meaning "earth-shaker lizard"
 The Earth-Shaker, a science fiction novel
 Earth Shaker (video game), a computer game
 Earthshaker! (pinball), a pinball game

See also 

 Earthquake (disambiguation)